Estadio Nacional (National Stadium in Spanish) is the name used for:

 Estadio Nacional de Hockey in Quilmes, Buenos Aires, Argentina
 Estadio Nacional Julio Martínez Prádanos in Santiago, Chile
 Estadio Nacional de Costa Rica (1924) in La Sabana, Costa Rica
 Estadio Nacional de Costa Rica (2011) in La Sabana, Costa Rica
 Estadio Nacional (Mexico) (demolished), formerly located in Colonia Roma, Mexico City, Mexico
 Estadio Nacional de Panamá in  Panama City, Panama
 Estadio Nacional (Lima) in Lima, Peru; nicknamed Coloso de José Díaz
 Estadio Nacional (film), a documentary film about the use of the Estadio Nacional de Chile as a concentration camp
 Estadio Tiburcio Carías Andino or Estadio Nacional, Tegucigalpa, Honduras

In Portuguese, Estádio Nacional (National Stadium) is used for:

 Estádio Nacional in Jamor, Portugal near Lisbon
 Estádio Nacional Mané Garrincha in Brasília, Brazil